Wake Forest High School, formerly Wake Forest-Rolesville High School, is a four-year high school (9–12) located in Wake Forest, North Carolina.

Demographics
In 2016–2017 there were just over 2,000 students attending Wake Forest High School. 59.4% of the student body was White, 23.0% was Black, 12.1% was Hispanic, 1.8% was Asian, and 3.7% was two or more races. Less than 1% of the students were Other.

Academics
On the College Board SAT, the school had a participation rate of 66% with an average score of 1,024. On the North Carolina, Math I, End-of-Course Test 10.2% of the participants were at or above grade level. For Biology, the average was 65% compared to the state average of 46%. For English II, the average was 63% while the state's average was 51%.

Notable alumni
 Ryan Cretens, professional soccer player
 Ariana DeBose, actress on Broadway
 Darius Hodge, NFL player
 Jamie Holland, NFL wide receiver
 Tyler Lassiter, Major League Soccer (MLS) player
 Dexter Lawrence, NFL defensive end
 Bryce Love, NFL running back
 Brynn Rumfallo, reality TV star, dancer and model
 Andrew Taylor, MLB pitcher
 Eric Williams, professional basketball player
 Mac Williamson, MLB player
 Robert Yates, NASCAR engine builder and owner

See also 
WCPSS

References 

http://www.greatschools.org/north-carolina/Wake-forest/1952-Wake-Forest-Rolesville-High/?tab=test-scores

External links
 Official website
 WCPSS School Directory
 

Public high schools in North Carolina
Wake Forest, North Carolina
Schools in Wake County, North Carolina
1941 establishments in North Carolina
Educational institutions established in 1941